East Lindsey District Council in Lincolnshire, England is elected every four years. The district is divided into 37 wards, electing 55 councillors. The last ward boundary changes came into effect in 2015.

Political control
The first election to the council was held in 1973, initially operating as a shadow authority before coming into its powers on 1 April 1974. Political control of the council since 1973 has been held by the following parties:

Leadership
The leaders of the council since 2001 have been:

Council elections
1973 East Lindsey District Council election
1976 East Lindsey District Council election
1979 East Lindsey District Council election
1983 East Lindsey District Council election (New ward boundaries)
1987 East Lindsey District Council election
1991 East Lindsey District Council election
1995 East Lindsey District Council election
1999 East Lindsey District Council election (New ward boundaries)
2003 East Lindsey District Council election
2007 East Lindsey District Council election
2011 East Lindsey District Council election
2015 East Lindsey District Council election (New ward boundaries)
2019 East Lindsey District Council election

By-election results

1995-1999

1999-2003

2003-2007

2007-2011

References

By-election results

External links
 East Lindsey District Council

 
East Lindsey District
Council elections in Lincolnshire
District council elections in England